Lukáš Dlouhý and Gilles Müller were the defending champions, but decided not to compete.

Illya Marchenko and Sergiy Stakhovsky won the title, defeating Ričardas Berankis and Franko Škugor in the final, 7–5, 6–3.

Seeds

Draw

Draw

References
 Main Draw

2013 Doubles
2013 ATP Challenger Tour